Crime in India has been recorded since the British Raj, with comprehensive statistics now compiled annually by the National Crime Records Bureau (NCRB), under the Ministry of Home Affairs (India) (MHA).

In 2021, a total of 60,96,310 crimes, comprising 36,63,360 Indian Penal Code (IPC) crimes and 24,32,950 Special and Local Laws (SLL) crimes were registered nationwide. It is a 7.65% annual decrease from 66,01,285 crimes in 2020; the crime rate (per 100,000 people) has decreased from 487.8 in 2020 to 445.9 in 2021, but still significantly higher from 385.5 in 2019. In 2021, offences affecting the human body contributed 30%, offences against property contributed 20.8%, and miscellaneous IPC crimes contributed 29.7% of all cognizable IPC crimes. Murder rate was 2.1 per 100,000, kidnapping rate was 7.4 per 100,000, and rape rate was 4.8 per 100,000 in 2021. According to the UN, the homicide rate was 2.95 per 100,000 in 2020 with 40,651 recorded, down from a peak of 5.46 per 100,000 in 1992 and essentially unchanged since 2017, higher than most countries in Asia and Europe and lower than most in the Americas and Africa although numerically one of the highest due to the large population.

Investigation rate is calculated as all cases disposed, quashed or withdrawn by police as a percentage of total cases available for investigation. The investigation rate of IPC crimes in India was 64.9% in 2021. Charge-sheeting rate is calculated as all cases, where charges were framed against accused, as a percentage of total cases disposed after investigation. The charge-sheeting rate of IPC crimes in India was 72.3% in 2021. Conviction rate is calculated as all cases, where accused was convicted by court after completion of a trial, as a percentage of total cases where trial was completed. The conviction rate of IPC crimes in India was 57.0% in 2021. In 2021, 51,540 murders were under investigation by police, of which charges were framed in 26,382; and 46,127 rapes were under investigation by police, of which charges were framed in 26,164. In 2021, 2,48,731 murders were under trial in courts, of which conviction was given in 4,304; and 1,85,836 rapes were under trial in courts, of which conviction was given in 3,368. The murder conviction rate was 42.4 and the rape conviction rate was 28.6 in 2021.

Over time

A report published by the NCRB compared the crime rates of 1953 and 2006. The report noted that burglary (known as house-breaking in India) declined over a period of 53 years by 79.84% (from 147,379, a rate of 39.3/100,000 in 1953 to 91,666, a rate of 7.9/100,000 in 2006), murder has increased by 7.39% (from 9,803, a rate of 2.61 in 1953 to 32,481, a rate of 2.81/100,000 in 2006).

Kidnapping increased by 47.80% (from 5,261, a rate of 1.40/100,000 in 1953 to 23,991, a rate of 2.07/100,000 in 2006), robbery declined by 28.85% (from 8,407, rate of 2.24/100,000 in 1953 to 18,456, rate of 1.59/100,000 in 2006) and riots have declined by 10.58% (from 20,529, a rate of 5.47/100,000 in 1953 to 56,641, a rate of 4.90/100,000 in 2006).

In 2006,  cognisable crimes were committed including  (IPC) crimes and  Special & Local Laws (SLL) crimes, with an increase of 1.5% over 2005 (50,26,337). IPC crime rate in 2006 was 167.7 compared to 165.3 in 2005 showing an increase of 1.5% in 2006 over 2005. SLL crime rate in 2006 was 287.9 compared to 290.5 in 2005 showing a decline of 0.9% in 2006 over 2005.

SOURCE: National Crime Records Bureau

Crime by location

As of 2019, Delhi had the highest crime rate (incidence of crime per 100,000 population) among all States of India at 1586.1, rising steeply from 1342.5. Delhi's crime rate was 4.1 times higher than the national average of 385.5 that year. States in Northeast India have consistently reported much lower crime rates, with 4 of the 5 states having the lowest crime in being from the region in 2018.

In terms of the absolute number of crimes in 2018, Uttar Pradesh reported the most (12.2% of nationally reported crime). Maharashtra, after topping the list over the previous 4-years, Kerala dropped to the third-position in absolute numbers, accounting for 10.1% of all crimes.

The violent crime rate (per 1,00,000 population) was highest in Assam (86.4), Tripura (62), Haryana (49.4), West Bengal (46.1) and Arunachal Pradesh (41.7). However, in terms of absolute number of cases, Uttar Pradesh reported the highest incidence of violent crimes accounting for 15.2% of total violent crimes in India (65,155 out of 4,28,134) followed by Maharashtra (10.7%), and Bihar and West Bengal each accounting for 10.4% of such cases.

Due to non-receipt of data from West Bengal in time for 2019, data furnished for 2018 has been used
Sources :

Cities
Among metropolitan cities, Kolkata (103.4 in 2021) was the safest city, however, the experts doubted the accuracy of the data. After Kolkata, Pune (256.8) and Hyderabad (259.9)  had the lowest crime rates (per 1 lakh urban population) among the 19-cities with more than two million inhabitants in India. While almost all major cities have historically had a crime rate higher than that of their domain states, since 2018, Kolkata and Mumbai (309.9) have been the only mega cities to have a lower crime rate than their states, West Bengal and Maharashtra respectively. Among other metropolises, Kozhikode (523.2) and Pune were the only ones to have a lower crime rate than their states. It is generally acknowledged that cities have a greater propensity to crime and that megacities have a higher crime rate than smaller cities.

Delhi (1906.8) remained the most crime ridden urban area in India for the fourth-year as of 2019. Over 82% of the 290,000 crimes in Delhi were thefts which jumped by more than 25% in 2019. In sharp contrast, thefts accounted for just a little over 20% of the 3.2 million crimes registered nationwide. Crime in the capital city has incrementally expanded over the previous years and jumped from 2018 when the rime rate was 1385.1. Despite significantly reducing in scale, the crime rate in Kochi remained the second-highest at 1711.2, mainly due to Kochi Police booking the highest number of rash driving cases in their jurisdiction, 10508 separate cases in 2019. Jaipur (1392.5) had the third-highest crime rate for the second-year, with crimes against women rising fast. The city had the highest rape rate of 35.6 per 100,000 population.

Crimes against women

Police records shows high incidence of crimes against women in India. Sexual assault against women in India is increasingly common. Despite a large population, statistically sexual assault in India is not rampant. According to the NCRB, as of 2018, the majority of crimes against women were registered under 'Cruelty by Husband or His Relatives' (31.9%) followed by 'Assault on Women with Intent to Outrage her Modesty' (27.6%), 'Kidnapping & Abduction of Women' (22.5%) and 'Rape' (10.3%). The crime rate per lakh women population was 58.8 in 2018, as compared to 57.9 in 2017.

Rape

Rape in India has been described by Radha Kumar as one of India's most common crimes against women. Official sources show that rape cases in India have doubled between 1990 and 2008. While already on an upward curve, rape cases suddenly spiked in 2013.

Disturbing incidents of rape on senior citizens and infants are increasingly common. The incidence of rape had gone up significantly during the COVID-19 pandemic in India.

As of 2018, it was the fourth most common crime against women with the number of registered rape cases rising from 32,559 in 2017 to 33,356. Of these, 31,320 cases (93.9%) had a culprit who was known to the victim. The states which saw the highest absolute number of rapes were Madhya Pradesh (5,433 or 16.3% of all cases), Rajasthan (4,355 or 13%), Uttar Pradesh (3,946 or 11.8%), Maharashtra (2,142 or 6.4%) and Chhattisgarh (2,091 or 6%).

In 2018, the national average rape rate (per 1,00,000 population) was 5.2, same as the previous year. Tamil Nadu (0.9), Nagaland (1.0) and Bihar (1.1) had the lowest rape rates while Chhattisgarh (14.7) had the highest rape rate.

Dowry

Dowries are considered a major contributor towards the violence against women in India.  Some of these offences include physical violence, emotional abuses, and murder of brides and girls.

Most dowry deaths occur when the young woman, unable to bear the harassment and torture, commits suicide. Most of these suicides are by hanging, poisoning or by fire. Sometimes the woman is killed by setting her on fire – this is known as bride burning, and is sometimes disguised as suicide or accident. In 2012, 8,233 dowry death cases were reported across India. Dowry issues caused 1.4 deaths per year per 100,000 women in India.

Domestic violence

Domestic violence in India is endemic. Around 70% of women in India are victims of domestic violence, according to Renuka Chowdhury, former Union minister for Women and Child Development.

The National Crime Records Bureau reveals that a crime against a woman is committed every three minutes, a woman is raped every 29 minutes, a dowry death occurs every 77 minutes, and one case of cruelty committed by either the husband or relative of the husband occurs every nine minutes. This occurs despite the fact that women in India are legally protected from domestic abuse under the Protection of Women from Domestic Violence Act.

Organised crime

Human Trafficking
Human trafficking in India is a serious issue. It usually comes in the form of offering employment to the poor and uneducated. Women are sold to brothels or families as maids, where they are usually raped, tortured and sexually assaulted. In 2021, India has passed a bill for fighting human trafficking. According to National Crime Records Bureau, 2,189 cases of human trafficking were registered in 2021 as compared to 1,714 in 2020. Among states, Telangana(347) reported highest number of cases, followed by Maharashtra(320) and Assam(203). 1,21,351 children were missing as of 2021 data, many of them potential victims of human trafficking.

Illegal drug trade
India is located between two major illicit opium producing centres in Asia – the Golden Crescent comprising Pakistan, Afghanistan and Iran and the Golden Triangle comprising Burma, Thailand and Laos. Because of such geographical location, India experiences large amount of drug trafficking through the borders. India is the world's largest producer of licit opium for the pharmaceutical trade. But an undetermined quantity of opium is diverted to illicit international drug markets.

India is a transshipment point for heroin from Southwest Asian countries like Afghanistan and Pakistan and from Southeast Asian countries like Burma, Laos, and Thailand. Heroin is smuggled from Pakistan and Burma, with some quantities transshipped through Nepal. Most heroin shipped from India are destined for Europe. There have been reports of heroin smuggled from Mumbai to Nigeria for further export.

In Maharashtra, Mumbai is an important centre for distribution of drug. The most commonly used drug in Mumbai is Indian heroin (called desi mal by the local population). Both public transportation (road and rail transportation) and private transportation are used for this drug trade.

Drug trafficking affects the country in many ways.
Drug abuse: Cultivation of illicit narcotic substances and drug trafficking affects the health of the individuals and destroy the economic structure of the family and society.
Organised crime: Drug trafficking results in growth of organised crime which affects social security. Organised crime connects drug trafficking with corruption and money laundering.
Political instability: Drug trafficking also aggravates the political instability in North-West and North-East India.

A survey conducted in 2003–2004 by Narcotics Control Bureau found that India has at least four million drug addicts. The most common drugs used in India are cannabis, hashish, opium and heroin. In 2006 alone, India's law enforcing agencies recovered 230 kg heroin and 203 kg of cocaine. In an annual government report in 2007, the United States named India among 20 major hubs for trafficking of illegal drugs along with Pakistan, Afghanistan and Burma. However, studies reveal that most of the criminals caught in this crime are either Nigerian or US nationals.

Several measures have been taken by the Government of India to combat drug trafficking in the country. India is a party of the Single Convention on Narcotic Drugs (1961), the Convention on Psychotropic Substances (1971), the Protocol Amending the Single Convention on Narcotic Drugs (1972) and the United Nations Convention Against Illicit Traffic in Narcotic Drugs and Psychotropic Substances (1988). An Indo-Pakistani committee was set up in 1986 to prevent trafficking in narcotic drugs. India signed a convention with the United Arab Emirates in 1994 to control drug trafficking. In 1995, India signed an agreement with Egypt for investigation of drug cases and exchange of information and a memorandum of understanding of the Prevention of Illicit Trafficking in Drugs with Iran.

Arms trafficking
According to a joint report published by Oxfam, Amnesty International and the International Action Network on Small Arms (IANSA) in 2006, there are around 40 million illegal small arms in India out of approximately 75 million in worldwide circulation. Majority of the illegal small arms make its way into the states of Bihar, Chhattisgarh, Uttar Pradesh, Jharkhand, Orissa and Madhya Pradesh. In UP, a used AK-47 costs $3,800 in black market. Large amount of illegal small arms are manufactured in various illegal arms factories in Uttar Pradesh and Bihar and sold on the black market for as little as $5.08.

Chinese pistols are in demand in the illegal small arms market in India because they are easily available and cheaper. This trend poses a significant problem for the states of Bihar, Uttar Pradesh, Jharkhand, Chhattisgarh, Orissa, Maharashtra, West Bengal, Karnataka and Andhra Pradesh which have influence of Naxalism. The porous Indo-Nepal border is an entry point for Chinese pistols, AK-47 and M-16 rifles into India as these arms are used by the Naxalites who have ties to Maoists in Nepal.

In North-East India, there is a huge influx of small arms due to the insurgent groups operating there.  The small arms in North-East India come from insurgent groups in Burma, black markets in Southeast Asia, Pakistan, Bangladesh, Nepal and Sri Lanka, black market in Cambodia, the People's Republic of China, insurgent groups like the Liberation Tigers of Tamil Eelam, the Communist Party of India (Maoist), the Communist Party of Nepal (Maoist Centre), Indian states like Uttar Pradesh and pilferages from legal gun factories,
criminal organisations operating in India and South Asian countries and
other international markets like Romania, Germany etc. Illegal weaponry found in North-East India includes small arms such as the M14, M16, AK-47, AK-56, and the AK-74, but also light machine guns, Chinese hand grenades, mines, rocket-propelled grenade launchers and submachine guns etc.

The Ministry of External Affairs and Ministry of Home Affairs drafted a joint proposal to the United Nations, seeking a global ban on small-arms sales to non-state users.

Poaching and wildlife trafficking
Illegal wildlife trade in India has increased. According to a report published by the Environmental Investigation Agency (EIA) in 2004, India is the chief target for the traders of wildlife skin. Between 1994 and 2003, there have been 784 cases where the skins of tiger, leopard or otter have been seized. Leopards, rhinoceros, reptiles, birds, insects, rare species of plants are being smuggled into the countries in Southeast Asia and the People's Republic of China. Between 1994 and 2003, poaching and seizure of 698 otters have been documented in India.

Kathmandu is a key staging point for illegal skins smuggled from India bound for Tibet and PRC. The report by EIA noted there has been a lack of cross-border cooperation between India, Nepal and the People's Republic of China to coordinate enforcement operations and lack of political will to treat wildlife crime effectively. The poaching of the Elephants is a significant problem in Southern India and in the North-Eastern states of Nagaland and Mizoram. The majority of tiger poaching happen in Madhya Pradesh, Uttar Pradesh, Orissa, West Bengal, Assam and Arunachal Pradesh. There was a famous leopard poaching case at Mankulam in Kerala in 2020. Following is a comparison of reported cases of tiger and leopard poaching from 1998 to 2003:

Samir Sinha, head of TRAFFIC India, the wildlife trade monitoring arm of the World Wide Fund for Nature (WWF) and the World Conservation Union (IUCN), told Reuters in an interview "The situation regarding the illegal trade in wildlife parts in India is very grim. It is a vast, a varied trade ranging from smuggling of rare medicinal plants to butterflies to peafowl to tigers and it is difficult to predict how big it is, but the threats and dimensions suggest that the trade is increasing".

Project Tiger, a wildlife conservation project, was initiated in 1972 and was launched by Indira Gandhi on 1 April 1973. With 23 tiger reserves, Project Tiger claimed to have succeeded. But according to critics like conservationist Billy Arjan Singh, temporary increases in tiger population were caused by immigration due to destruction of habitat in Nepal, not because of the widely acclaimed success of wildlife policy in India.

Cyber crime
The Information Technology Act 2000 was passed by the Parliament of India in May 2000, aiming to curb cyber crimes and provide a legal framework for e-commerce transactions. However Pavan Duggal, lawyer of Supreme Court of India and cyber law expert, viewed "The IT Act, 2000, is primarily meant to be a legislation to promote e-commerce. It is not very effective in dealing with several emerging cyber crimes like cyber harassment, defamation, stalking and so on". Although cyber crime cells have been set up in major cities, Duggal noted the problem is that most cases remain unreported due to a lack of awareness.

In 2001, India and United States had set up an India-US cyber security forum as part of a counter-terrorism dialogue.

In 2021, according to NCRB data, 52,974 cyber crime cases were registered in India, a rise of 5% compared to 2020 (50,035) cases. Telangana reported highest number of cyber crimes in India with 10,303 cases, followed by Uttar Pradesh (8,829) and Karnataka (8,136) in the number of cyber crimes reported, while Karnataka registered highest number of cyber crimes against women.

In 2021, the motive behind 60.8% of the cyber crimes was fraud, followed by sexual exploitation in 8.6 per cent (4,555) cases and extortion in 5.4 per cent (2,883) cases.

India ranked second globally in terms of cyber crimes on health systems in 2021, according to a report by CloudSEK, a company which predicts cyber threats. The breached data included vaccination records, personally identifiable information, like name, address, email, contact number, and gender, and log in details of hospitals. Such attacks can also shut down equipment during surgery or in intensive care units.

Corruption and police misconduct

Corruption is widespread in India. It is prevalent within every section and every level of the society. Corruption has taken the role of a pervasive aspect of Indian politics. In India, corruption takes the form of bribes, evasion of tax and exchange controls, embezzlement, etc.

Despite state prohibitions against torture and custodial misconduct by the police, torture is widespread in police custody, which is a major reason behind deaths in custody. The police often torture innocent people until a 'confession' is obtained to save influential and wealthy offenders. G.P. Joshi, the programme coordinator of the Indian branch of the Commonwealth Human Rights Initiative in New Delhi comments that the main issue at hand concerning police violence is a lack of accountability of the police.

In 2006, the Supreme Court of India in a judgment in the Prakash Singh vs. Union of India case, ordered central and state governments with seven directives to begin the process of police reform. The main objectives of this set of directives was twofold, providing tenure to and streamlining the appointment/transfer processes of policemen, and increasing the accountability of the police.

In 2006, seven policemen were charge sheeted and eleven were convicted for custodial misconduct. Jan Lokpal Bill is being planned to reduce the corruption.

Other crimes

Petty crime
Petty crime, like pickpocketing, theft of valuables from luggage on trains and buses have been reported. Travelers who are not in groups become easy victims of pickpockets and purse snatchers. Purse snatchers work in crowded areas.

Confidence tricks
Many scams are perpetrated against foreign travellers, especially in Jaipur, the capital of Rajasthan. Scammers usually target younger foreign tourists and suggest to them that money can be made by privately transporting gems or gold, or by taking delivery abroad of expensive carpets, avoiding customs duties.

Such incidents occupy the traveller for several days. The traveller is then passed to a new scam artist who offers to show the foreign traveller the sights. Scam artists also offer cheap lodgings and meals to foreign travellers so they can place him or her in the scam artist's physical custody and thus make the foreigner vulnerable to threats and physical coercion. In the process, the foreigner loses his passport.

Besides these, there are also unofficial guides to watch out for. They can be found all over India such as at crowded transportation hubs and at tourist attractions. A common ruse at transportation hubs is to claim that there is no train to your destination or to claim that a place is closed. The aim is to get you to take their expensive private transport or to an expensive hotel where they get a cut. As for the guides at tourist attractions, these could be temples, mosques, or places such as the Varanasi Ghat. You will end up receiving unsolicited services and then asked to pay a big tip for them.

Taxi scam
There are also taxi scams present in India, whereby a foreign traveller, who is not aware of the locations around Indian airports, is taken for a ride round the whole airport and charged for full-fare taxi ride while the terminal is only few hundred yards away. Overseas Security Advisory Council in a report mentioned the process about how to avoid taxi-scam.  This crime is known in other areas of the world as "long-hauling".

Preventing crimes
Crime prevention is critical to maintain law and order in the country. Deterring criminals through deployment of more police is one of the major strategy practised. However, their relationship is very complex. There are also other reasons such as unemployment, poverty, a lower per capita income which can affect the crime rates in India.

See also

Law enforcement in India
Crime and Criminal Tracking Network and Systems
Indian Penal Code
Organised crime in India
List of scandals in India
Kala Kachcha gang
Mafia Raj
Caste-related violence in India
Religious violence in India
Rape in India

Notes

Further reading
.
.
.
.
.

External links 
 National Crime Records Bureau 
 Helpline numbers by Crime in Delhi 
http://indianexpress.com/article/explained/ncrb-data-uttar-pradesh-crime-rate-up-police-3033360/
 Crime in India – 2010 statistics
 Crime rates in India State Wise
 New trends in drug trafficking
 India becoming hot bed for drug trafficking: Expert
 Mumbai mafia is using more sophisticated weapons than police
 People Not Poaching: The Communities and IWT Learning Platform